Fonacier is a surname. Notable people with the surname include:

Chai Fonacier, Filipino actress, singer, writer, and songwriter
Larry Fonacier (born 1982), Filipino basketball player
Tomas Fonacier (1898–1981), Filipino historian and educator

Tagalog-language surnames